Silver Stadium is a multi-use stadium in Lilongwe, Malawi.  It is currently used mostly for football matches, on club level by Silver Strikers of the Super League of Malawi. The stadium has a capacity of 20,000 spectators.

References

Football venues in Malawi
Buildings and structures in Lilongwe